The Vivari Channel (Albanian: Kanali i Butrintit, also known as Butrinto River) links Lake Butrint in Albania with the Straits of Corfu, and forms a border of the peninsula of Butrint.

The channel flows in both directions, from the lake to the sea and vice versa during the rising tide. A pontoon is situated near the gate of the Butrint National Park. Two small forts are located in the southern part of the channel; both were built during the rule of Ali Pasha of Ioannina.

According to international organizations, the channel serves as the demarcation line where the Adriatic Sea ends and the Ionian Sea begins.

The channel creates a unique situation in Lake Butrint, which is partly fed with fresh water and partly with salt water, thereby creating ideal conditions for mollusks farming. During the communist regime, many students used to volunteer in the summer time to search for ancient ruins in the Butrint National Park.

See Also
 Butrinti
 Butrint National Park
 Venetian Acropolis Castle
 Venetian Triangular Castle
 Lake Butrint
 Geography of Albania
 Lakes of Albania & Lagoons of Albania

References

 
Bodies of water of Albania
Geography of Vlorë County 
Landforms of the Ionian Islands (region)
Channels of Europe
Butrint National Park